Bright Red is the fifth studio album by American avant-garde musician Laurie Anderson, released by Warner Bros. in 1994.

The album continues the more pop-oriented direction Anderson launched with Strange Angels. Produced by Brian Eno (who also co-wrote several of the songs with Anderson), Bright Red is divided into two parts: "Bright Red" and "Tightrope".

The song "The Puppet Motel" was also featured on an interactive CD-ROM titled Puppet Motel, released by Anderson in 1994. "Speak My Language" is a re-recording of a song Anderson previously performed on the soundtrack to the 1993 film Faraway, So Close and was also featured in the 1995 film Fallen Angels. The song "Beautiful Pea Green Boat" has additional lyrics from the poem "The Owl and the Pussycat" by Edward Lear (misspelled "Edwin" in the album's liner notes). Lou Reed duets with Anderson on the album's lone single, "In Our Sleep", and can be heard singing backup on many other songs. Reed and Anderson later married.

Track listing
All lyrics and music by Laurie Anderson, except where otherwise indicated.

Bright Red
"Speechless (The Eagle and the Weasel)" – 5:20
"Bright Red" (additional lyrics from Isaiah 13:21) – 3:12 
"The Puppet Motel" (lyrics: Anderson; music: Anderson, Brian Eno) – 3:09 
"Speak My Language" – 3:38
"World Without End" – 2:47
"Freefall" – 4:32
"Muddy River" (lyrics: Anderson; music: Anderson, Eno) – 3:02

Tightrope
"Beautiful Pea Green Boat" (additional lyrics from "The Owl and the Pussycat" by Edward Lear) – 4:20
"Love Among the Sailors" – 2:49
"Poison" (lyrics: Anderson; music: Anderson, Eno) – 3:47
"In Our Sleep" (lyrics: Anderson, Lou Reed; music: Anderson) – 2:31
"Night in Baghdad" – 3:23
"Tightrope" (lyrics: Anderson; music: Anderson, Eno) – 6:02
"Same Time Tomorrow" – 3:51

Personnel

Musicians
Laurie Anderson – vocals (tracks 1–14), keyboards (1–2, 4–6, 8–14), violin (4), percussion (8)
Phil Ballou – back-up vocals (1, 7–8)
Cyro Baptista – temple blocks (1), gong (1), surdo (3–4, 8, 11, 13–14), shaker (3–4, 8, 12–14), triangle (4, 12), tambourine (11), ceramic drum (12), tubes (12)
Joey Baron – drums (1, 3–4, 6–7, 10–11)
Brian Eno – treatments (1, 3–4, 13), keyboards (1–6, 8, 10–11, 13), drum treatments (6, 10–11), loops (8, 10)
Ben Fenner – bass guitar (1)
Guy Klucevsek – accordion (1, 4, 8, 12)
Gerry Leonard – guitar (1, 5–6, 8, 11–12)
Arto Lindsay – vocals (2)
Greg Cohen – guitar (3–4), bass guitar (3–4, 6)
Jamie West-Oram – guitar (4, 6)
Kevin Killen – treatments (5, 8)
Adrian Belew – guitar (6, 8, 10, 12–13)
Neil Conti – shaker (6)
Dougie Bowne – drums (8)
Marc Ribot – guitar (10)
Lou Reed – vocals (11), guitar (11)
Peter Scherer – keyboards (12)

Technical
Brian Eno – producer
Laurie Anderson – co-producer
Kevin Killen – engineer, mixing
Greg Cohen – music director
Joe Ferla – additional basic tracks engineer
Ben Fenner – overdubs engineer (Westside)
Alec Head – additional overdubs engineer (The Lobby)
Hiro Ishihara – assistant engineer
Andy Baker – assistant engineer
Danton Supple – assistant engineer
Miles Green – assistant engineer
Bob Ludwig – mastering
Yolanda Cuomo – design
Monika Rittershaus – cover photo
Neil Selkirk – inside front cover photo
Stephen Cohen – back cover photo
John Walker – video images
Annie Leibovitz – MRI image
Samantha Levin – snapshots

References

1994 albums
Albums produced by Brian Eno
Laurie Anderson albums
Warner Records albums